The Texan may refer to:

 The Texan (fictional character), a character in Catch-22
 The Texan (TV series), starring Rory Calhoun
 The Texan (1920 film), an American film directed by Lynn Reynolds
 The Texan (1930 film), an American film starring Gary Cooper and Fay Wray
 The Texan (1932 film), American western film directed by Clifford S. Smith
 The Texan (play), starring Tyrone Power Sr.
 The Texan, web publication founded by former Texas state Senator Konni Burton

See also
 The Texans, a 1938 American Western film
 The Texan Meets Calamity Jane, a 1950 American Western film